Bart Kennedy (1861–1930) was an English novelist, memoirist and journalist.

Biography
Kennedy was born in Leeds of Irish parents. From the age of 6 until about the age of 20 he worked in cotton mills and machine shops in Manchester, England. At age 20 he left England, working as a deckhand on a cargo ship which landed him in Philadelphia, Pennsylvania. Illiterate and with no money or formal training, he used the force of his strength (and fist) to "tramp" his way westward across North America. He worked at various laboring jobs including as an oysterman on a skipjack on the Chesapeake Bay; a miner in New York; building railroad sheds in the Canadian Rockies; and panning for gold in the Klondike. He eventually ended up in California where he had various jobs in the theater, including as a singer and actor, before returning to England, where in October 1897 he married Isabel Priestley, a political activist.

Writing career

Kennedy published his first novel, Darab's Wine Cup, in 1897, followed by The Wandering Romanoff (1898). A fair amount of autobiography is contained in A Man Adrift (1899), A Sailor Tramp (1902) and A Tramp in Spain (1904), books about his "tramping" exploits around the world. John Sutherland (1989) says "As an author, he is one of the early advocates of 'tramping', as the source of literary inspiration."

Kennedy also wrote articles for magazines such as The New Age.

A review of A Tramp in Spain notes that Kennedy took several opportunities in that work to voice his disapproval of the United States that he had seen in 1882-1897.

Published works
Darab's Wine Cup (1897)
The Wandering Romanoff (1898)
A Man Adrift (1899)
A Sailor Tramp (1902)
A Tramp in Spain (1904)
Slavery (1905)
The Green Sphinx (1905)
A Tramp Camp (1906)
The German Danger (1907)
Soldiers of Labour (1917)
Golden Green (1926)

Notes

External links
 

1861 births
1930 deaths
English male journalists
20th-century English novelists
English male novelists
20th-century English male writers